|}

The Prix Jacques Le Marois is a Group 1 flat horse race in France open to thoroughbred colts and fillies aged three years or older. It is run at Deauville over a distance of 1,600 metres (about 1 mile), and it is scheduled to take place each year in August.

History
The event is named in memory of Jacques Le Marois (1865–1920), a president of the venue's former governing body, the Société des Courses de Deauville. It was established in 1921, and was originally restricted to three-year-olds.

Deauville Racecourse was closed during World War II, and the Prix Jacques Le Marois was cancelled in 1940. For the remainder of this period it was switched between Maisons-Laffitte (1941–43, 1945) and Longchamp (1944). It returned to Deauville in 1946, and was opened to horses aged four or older in 1952.

The Fresnay-le-Buffard stud farm became the sponsor of the Prix Jacques Le Marois in 1986. From this point the event was known as the Prix du Haras de Fresnay-le-Buffard-Jacques Le Marois.

The race was added to the Breeders' Cup Challenge series in 2010. The winner now earns an invitation to compete in the same year's Breeders' Cup Mile.

Records
Most successful horse (2 wins):
 Miesque – 1987, 1988
 Spinning World – 1996, 1997
 Palace Pier – 2020, 2021

Leading jockey (7 wins):
 Frankie Dettori – Dubai Millennium	(1999), Muhtathir (2000), Librettist (2006), Al Wukair (2017), Palace Pier (2020, 2021), Inspiral (2022)

Leading trainer (7 wins):
 François Boutin – Nonoalco (1974), Miesque (1987, 1988), Priolo (1990), Hector Protector (1991), Exit to Nowhere (1992), East of the Moon (1994)
 André Fabre – Polish Precedent (1989), Miss Satamixa (1995), Vahorimix (2001), Banks Hill (2002), Manduro (2007), Esoterique (2015), Al Wukair (2017)

Leading owner (10 wins):
 Marcel Boussac – Zariba (1922), Xander (1928), Cillas (1938), Semiramide (1939), Priam (1944), Coaraze (1945), Djelal (1947), Golestan (1948), Arbele (1952), Canthare (1953)

Winners since 1972

Earlier winners

 1921: Guerriere
 1922: Zariba
 1923: Sir Gallahad
 1924: Ivain
 1925: Coram
 1926: Saint Fortunat
 1927: Vitamine
 1928: Xander
 1929: Slipper
 1930: Pontet Canet
 1931: Pearl Cap
 1932: Henin
 1933: Arpette
 1934: Shining Tor
 1935: Aromate
 1936: King Kong
 1937: En Fraude
 1938: Cillas
 1939: Semiramide
 1940: no race
 1941: Princesse Palatine
 1942: Fine Art
 1943: Dogat
 1944: Priam
 1945: Coaraze
 1946: Sayani
 1947: Djelal
 1948: Golestan
 1949: Amour Drake
 1950: Fort Napoleon
 1951: Seigneur
 1952: Arbele
 1953: Canthare
 1954: Ti Moun
 1955: Klairon
 1956: Buisson Ardent
 1957: Balbo
 1958: Coup de Canon
 1959: Sallymount
 1960: Djebel Traffic
 1961: Net
 1962: Lebon M L
 1963: Hula Dancer
 1964: La Bamba
 1965: Astaria
 1966: The Marshal
 1967: Carabella
 1968: Luthier
 1969: Gris Vitesse
 1970: Priamos
 1971: Dictus

See also
 List of French flat horse races

References

 France Galop / Racing Post:
 galop.courses-france.com:
 1921–1949, 1950–1979, 1980–present
 france-galop.com – A Brief History: Prix Jacques Le Marois.
 galopp-sieger.de – Prix Jacques Le Marois.
 horseracingintfed.com – International Federation of Horseracing Authorities – Prix Jacques Le Marois (2018).
 pedigreequery.com – Prix Jacques Le Marois – Deauville.

Open mile category horse races
Deauville-La Touques Racecourse
Horse races in France
Breeders' Cup Challenge series
Recurring sporting events established in 1921
1921 establishments in France